Sidney Costantino, Baron Sonnino (11 March 1847 – 24 November 1922) was an Italian statesman, 19th prime minister of Italy and twice served briefly as one, in 1906 and again from 1909 to 1910. He also was the Italian minister of Foreign Affairs during the First World War, representing Italy at the 1919 Paris Peace Conference.

Early life
Sonnino was born in Pisa to an Italian Jewish father, Isacco Saul Sonnino, who converted to Anglicanism, and a Welsh mother, Georgina Sophia Arnaud Dudley Menhennet. He was raised as  an Anglican by his family. His grandfather had emigrated from Livorno to Egypt, where he had built up an enormous fortune as a banker. As an young man, Sonnino suffered from a severe case of unrequited love, which badly damaged his self-esteem. In a typical entry in his diary, Sonnino wrote: "Who can and should love this nonentity lacking all physical and moral attraction?" To make up for his distress when the object of his affection married someone else, Sonnino took to long solitary walks and threw himself obsessively into work as he sought career success as a sort of consolation prize for his broken heart. 

After graduating in law in Pisa in 1865, Sonnino became a diplomat and an official at the Italian embassies in Madrid, Vienna, Berlin, Paris and Saint Petersburg from 1866 to 1873. His family lived at the Castello Sonnino in Quercianella, near Livorno. He retired from the diplomatic service in 1873.

In 1876, Sonnino travelled to Sicily with Leopoldo Franchetti to conduct a private investigation into the state of Sicilian society. In 1877, the two men published their research on Sicily in a substantial two-part report for the Italian Parliament. In the first part, Sonnino analysed the lives of the island's landless peasants. Leopoldo Franchetti's half of the report, Political and Administrative Conditions in Sicily, was an analysis of the Mafia in the 19th century that is still considered authoritative today. Franchetti would ultimately influence public opinion about the Mafia more than anyone else until Giovanni Falcone, over 100 years later. Political and Administrative Conditions in Sicily is the first convincing explanation of how the Mafia came to be.

In 1878, Sonnino and Franchetti started a newspaper, La Rassegna Settimanale, which changed from weekly economic reviews to daily political issues.

Early political career
Sonnino was elected in the Italian Chamber of Deputies for the first time in the general elections in May 1880, from the constituency of San Casciano in Val di Pesa. He belonged to the chamber to September 1919 from the XIV to XXIV legislature and supported universal suffrage. Sonnino soon became one of the leading opponents of the Liberal Left. As a strict constitutionalist, he favoured strong government to resist pressure of special interests, which made him a conservative liberal.

In December 1893, he became Minister of Finance (December 1893 – June 1894) and Minister of the Treasury (December 1893 – March 1896) in the government of Francesco Crispi and tried to solve the Banca Romana scandal. Sonnino envisaged establishing a single bank of issue, but the main priority of his bank reform was to rapidly solve the financial problems of the Banca Romana and to cover up the scandal that involved the political class, rather than to design a new national banking system. The newly-established Banca d'Italia was the result of a merger of three existing banks of issue (the Banca Nazionale and two banks from Tuscany). Regional interests were still strong, which caused the compromise of plurality of note issuance with the Banco di Napoli and the Banco di Sicilia and th provision for tighter state control.

As Minister of the Treasury, Sonnino restructured public finances, imposed new taxes and cut public spending. The budget deficit was sharply reduced from 174 million lire in 1893–94 to 36 million in 1896–97. After the fall of the Crispi government as a result of the lost Battle of Adwa in March 1896, he served as the leader of the opposition conservatives against the liberal Giovanni Giolitti. In January 1897, Sonnino published an article, Torniamo allo Statuto (Let's go back to the Statute), in which he sounded the alarm about the threats that the clergy, the republicans and the socialists posed to liberalism. He called for the abolition of the parliamentary government and the return of the royal prerogative to appoint and to dismiss the prime minister without consulting parliament, which he considered to be the only possible way to avert the danger. In 1901, he founded a new major newspaper, Il Giornale d'Italia.

Opposition and Prime Minister
In response to the social reforms presented by Prime Minister Giuseppe Zanardelli in November 1902, Sonnino introduced a reform bill to alleviate poverty in southern Italy that provided for a reduction of the land tax in Sicily, Calabria and Sardinia; the facilitation of agricultural credit; the re-establishment of the system of perpetual lease for smallholdings (emphyteusis) and the dissemination and the enhancement of agrarian contracts to combine the interests of farmers with those of the landowners. Sonnino criticised the usual approach to solve the crisis through public works: "to construct railways where there is no trade is like giving a spoon to a man who has nothing to eat."

Sonnino's uncompromising severity towards others long proved to be an obstacle to forming his own government. Nevertheless, Sonnino served twice briefly as prime minister. On 8 February 1906, Sonnino formed his first government, which lasted only three months. On 18 May 1906, after a mere 100 days, he was forced to resign. He proposed major changes to transform Southern Italy, which provoked opposition from the ruling groups. Land taxes were to be reduced by one third except for the largest landowners. He also proposed the establishment of provincial banks and subsidies to schools. His reforms provoked opposition from the ruling groups, and he was succeeded by Giovanni Giolitti.

On 11 December 1909, Sonnino formed his second government with a strong connotation to the centre-right, but it did not last much longer and fell on 21 March 1910.

First World War

After the July Crisis, Sonnino initially supported maintaining the Triple Alliance with Germany and Austria-Hungary in 1914. He firmly believed that Italian self-interest entailed participation in the war, with its prospect of Italian territorial gains as a completion of Italian unification. However, after becoming Foreign Minister in November 1914 in the conservative government of Antonio Salandra and realising that it was unlikely to secure Austro-Hungarian agreement to concede territories to Italy, he sided with the Triple Entente of United Kingdom, France and Russia, and he sanctioned the secret Treaty of London in April 1915 to fulfill Italian irredentist claims. Italy declared war on Austria-Hungary on May 23, 1915. During the talks, Sonnino omitted to include the largely Italian-speaking Austrian city of Fiume (modern Rijeka, Croatia) into the lands that were to go to Italy, an omission that he later would regret in 1919. 

Sonnino followed what he called a "Bismarckian" foreign policy under which all that mattered was sacro egoismo ("sacred egoism"). The term sacro egoismo as the guiding principle of his foreign policy was Sonnino's way of saying that the interests of the Italian state were to be pursued via a ruthless policy of realpolitik. Sonnino felt no great animosity towards the Austrian empire and no great love for the Allies, and only favored intervening on the Allied side because the French, British and Russian diplomats he was talking with were willing to promise Italy more than the Austrian and German diplomats. Sonnino admitted in private that he would had favored having Italy enter the war on the side of the Central Powers if only their diplomats had promised more than the Allied diplomats.

Paris Peace Conference, 1919

He remained Foreign Minister in three consecutive governments and represented Italy at the 1919 Paris Peace Conference with Prime Minister Vittorio Emanuele Orlando. In January 1919, just before the conference started, the American president Woodrow Wilson paid the first visit by a U.S. president to Italy, where he was welcomed as a hero in Rome. Sonnino was less welcoming as he wrote that he was "disgusted" when Wilson told him that he was sincere about having national self-determination to be the basis of the peace. The Italians had broken the American diplomatic codes, and Sonnino was much offended when he learned that State Department had debated the merits of having Wilson ask for Sonnino to be dropped from the Italian cabinet during his visit to Rome. Orlando had favored having Italy renounce its claims to Dalmatia and the Dodecanese archipelago in exchange for American support for Italy annexing the rest of the lands promised by the Treaty of London, but Sonnino chose to take the maximalist position of demanding all of the lands promised by the Treaty of London. Howver, Sonnino went to Paris, promising in public that national self-determination was to be the basis of the post-world order without being opposed in private, a slight-of-hand argument that Wilson at first took at face value. 

Sonnino defended the literal application of the Treaty of London and opposed to a policy of self-determination for the peoples in the former Austro-Hungarian territories. King Victor Emmanuel III chose not to impose clear guidelines on the Italian delegation out of the fear that either Orlando or Sonnino might resign in protest, which would leave the king with the responsibility of overseeing the formation of a new government, a duty that king wished to avoid. Victor Emmanuel was close to the generals of the Regio Esercito, who advised against annexing Dalamatia under the grounds that garrisoning it would represent an intolerable financial burden on the Italian state. However, the king did not wish to appear "unpatriotic" by dismissing Sonnino and instead ordered the Italian delegation to secure as much of Italy's "just aspirations" as possible in Paris. The vague nature of the king's mandate with the orders to secure Italy's "just aspirations" allowed Sonnino and Orlando to pursue different policies at the Paris peace conference as Orlando was more open to compromises with Wilson than Sonnino. 

Wilson had stated that national self-determination was to be the basis of the peace. However, Wilson supported per the Treaty fo London the Italian claim to have the Brenner Pass as the new Italian-Austrian frontier and for Italy to annex the Austrian province of South Tyrol despite the fact that South Tyrol had a German majority. Sonnino often argued to Wilson that because Italy lost half-million killed in the war that felt the Allies had an obligation to fulfill all of the terms of the Treaty of London. Sonnino's cold and aloft personality made him few friends at the conference, and his unwillingness to lobby the other delegates, which he considered to be beneath him, won him no allies at the conference.    

Orlando's inability to speak English and his weak political position at home allowed Sonnino to play a dominant role. Their differences proved to be disastrous during the negotiations. Orlando was prepared to renounce territorial claims for Dalmatia to annex Rijeka (or Fiume, as the Italians called the town), a major seaport on the Adriatic Sea, but Sonnino was not prepared to give up Dalmatia. Italy ended up claiming both but got none because of strong opposition to the Italian demands by US President Woodrow Wilson, who had a policy of national self-determination. Sonnino stubbornly maintained that Italy was entitled to a larger share of Asia Minor than it was promised under the Treaty of London, and received a promise that Italy would have a larger occupation zone in what is now southwestern Turkey. The belief that Sonnino was seeking to add the city of Smyrna (modern Izmir, Turkey) where slightly less than one half of the population was Greek-speaking, to the Italian occupation zone led directly to the Greek prime minister Eleftherios Venizelos ordering the Greek army to occupy Smyrna in May 1919, which set off the Greek-Turkish war.

Later life
After the territorial ambitions of Italy towards Austria-Hungary had to be substantially reduced, Orlando's government resigned in June 1919. That was the end of Sonnino's political career, and he did not participate in the elections in November 1919. He was nominated senator in October 1920 bur did not actively participate. Sonnino died suddenly on 24 November 1922 in Rome after he had suffered an apoplectic stroke.

Legacy
Known as the "silent statesman of Italy", he could speak five languages fluently. Sonnino's main aims were to revive southern Italy economically and morally and to fight illiteracy. He never married.

The only Protestant leader in Italian politics, Sonnino was described as "decidedly British in manner and thought" and "the great puritan of the Chamber, the last uncorrupted man". His stern intransigent moralism made him a difficult man, and although his integrity was universally respected, his closed and taciturn personality gained him few friends in political circles.

A New York Times obituary described Sonnino as an intellectual aristocrat, a great financier and an accomplished scholar with little talent for popularity whose greatness would have been unmistakable in the days of absolute monarchy. He was further portrayed as a very able diplomat who belonged to the "old" diplomacy with an undeserved prominence at the Paris Peace Conference as the typical imperialistic annexationist although the diplomatic rules had changed.

According to the historian R. J. B. Bosworth, "Sidney Sonnino, who was Foreign Minister from 1914 to 1919, and with a personal reputation, perhaps deserved, for honesty in all his dealings, has strong claims to have conducted Italy's least successful foreign policy."

Trivia
On 16 April 1909 Wilbur Wright took Sonnino on a flight at Centocelle field, Rome, making Sonnino one of the earliest of statesmen to fly in an airplane.

List of Sonnino's cabinets

1st cabinet  (8 February  29 May 1906)

2nd cabinet  (11 December 1909  31 March 1910)

References

Books
 Bosworth, R.J.B. (2013). Italy and the Wider World: 1860–1960, New York: Routledge, 
 Burgwyn, H. James (1997). Italian Foreign Policy in the Interwar Period, 1918–1940, Greenwood Publishing Group, 
 Clark, Martin (2008). Modern Italy: 1871 to the present, Harlow: Pearson Education, 
 Dickie, John (2004). Cosa Nostra. A history of the Sicilian Mafia, London: Coronet 

 Morley Sachar, Howard (2006). A History of the Jews in the Modern World, Vintage Books, 
 Rossini, Daniela (2008). Woodrow Wilson and the American Myth in Italy: Culture, Diplomacy, and War Propaganda, Cambridge (MA)/London: Harvard University Press, 
 Sarti, Roland (2004). Italy: a reference guide from the Renaissance to the present, New York: Facts on File Inc., 
 Seton-Watson, Christopher (1967). Italy from liberalism to fascism, 1870–1925, New York: Taylor & Francis, 1967

External links

 Centro Studi Sidney Sonnino
 

1847 births
1922 deaths
People from Pisa
Grand Duchy of Tuscany people
Barons of Italy
Italian Anglicans
Italian people of Jewish descent
Italian people of British descent
Historical Right politicians
Italian Liberal Party politicians
Prime Ministers of Italy
Foreign ministers of Italy
Finance ministers of Italy
Italian Ministers of the Interior
Deputies of Legislature XIV of the Kingdom of Italy
Deputies of Legislature XV of the Kingdom of Italy
Deputies of Legislature XVI of the Kingdom of Italy
Deputies of Legislature XVII of the Kingdom of Italy
Deputies of Legislature XVIII of the Kingdom of Italy
Deputies of Legislature XIX of the Kingdom of Italy
Deputies of Legislature XX of the Kingdom of Italy
Deputies of Legislature XXI of the Kingdom of Italy
Deputies of Legislature XXII of the Kingdom of Italy
Deputies of Legislature XXIII of the Kingdom of Italy
Deputies of Legislature XXIV of the Kingdom of Italy
Members of the Senate of the Kingdom of Italy
Politicians of Tuscany
Historians of the Sicilian Mafia